Belidaphne brunettii is an extinct species of sea snails, a marine gastropod mollusc in the family Mangeliidae.

Description

Distribution
This extinct marine species was found in Italy.

References

External links
  Della Bella G., Naldi F. & Scarponi D. (2015). Molluschi marini del Plio-Pleistocene dell'Emilia-Romagna e della Toscana - Superfamiglia Conoidea, vol. 4, Mangeliidae II. Lavori della Società Italiana di Malacologia. 26: 1-80

brunettii
Gastropods described in 2015
Prehistoric gastropods